Areas imperialis is a moth of the family Erebidae. It was described by Vincenz Kollar in 1844. It is found in Tibet, the north-western Himalayas, Sikkim and Nepal.

References

Spilosomina
Moths of Asia
Fauna of the Himalayas
Lepidoptera of Nepal
Insects of Bhutan
Fauna of Sikkim
Fauna of Tibet
Taxa named by Vincenz Kollar
Moths described in 1844